Mario Alcides Camacho Jiménez  (born 7 August 1983) is a Costa Rican professional football striker playing for Belén.

Club career
Camacho started his professional career at Carmelita and also played for Herediano, 
Puntarenas, Alajuelense and Santos de Guápiles whom he joined in January 2011. He returned to second division Carmelita in summer 2012 before joining Belén FC in January 2014.

International career
Camacho made his debut for Costa Rica in a June 2007 CONCACAF Gold Cup match against Haiti and has earned a total of 3 caps, scoring no goals. He has represented his country, coming on as a second-half substitute at the 2007 CONCACAF Gold Cup.

His final international was a May 2009 friendly match against Venezuela.

References

External links
 
 Player profile - Nacion.com

1983 births
Living people
People from Alajuela
Association football forwards
Costa Rican footballers
Costa Rica international footballers
2007 CONCACAF Gold Cup players
A.D. Carmelita footballers
Liga FPD players
C.S. Herediano footballers
Puntarenas F.C. players
L.D. Alajuelense footballers
Santos de Guápiles footballers
Belén F.C. players